The Kentucky Juvenile Stakes is an American Thoroughbred horse race held annually in early May at Churchill Downs in Louisville, Kentucky. The event is open to two-year-old horses. Previously a race contested at five and a half furlongs on dirt, it has been run at a distance of five furlongs since 2006.

It first became a Grade III race in 1999. The event was not run in 2005 and six years later in 2011 was removed from the calendar. The event was resumed in 2016 as a Black Type event.

Records
Speed record
 5 furlongs – 0:57.46 – Rated Fiesty (2007)
 5.5 furlongs – 1:03.11 – Leelanau (2001) (new track record)

Most wins by a trainer
 6 – Steve Asmussen (2002, 2003, 2004, 2006 ,2007, 2021) (five consecutive editions)

Most wins by a jockey
 4 – Shane Sellers (1994, 1996, 1998 & 2004)

Winners of the Kentucky Juvenile Stakes since 1988

Notes:

† In the 2021 running of the event Averly Jane was first past the post and wagering was paid out as the winner, however the horse returned a positive swab testing positive for metformin and consequently was disqualified from the prize money and was placed seventh (last). Vodka N Water was declared the official winner of the event.

References
 The 2008 Kentucky Stakes at the NTRA

Churchill Downs horse races
Flat horse races for two-year-olds
Recurring sporting events established in 1988
1988 establishments in Kentucky